Bradford East is a constituency represented in the House of Commons of the UK Parliament since 2015 by Imran Hussain of the Labour Party.

Constituency profile
Bradford East covers the north east and east parts of Bradford and has a significant number of non-white residents. Residents are poorer than the UK average.

History
The constituency had existed from 1885 to 1974. Following a 2007–2009 review of parliamentary boundaries in West Yorkshire by the Boundary Commission for England, the Bradford North constituency was abolished and Bradford East created for the 2010 general election.

Boundaries

Municipal boundaries of Bradford
Bradford was incorporated as a municipal borough in 1847, covering the parishes of Bradford, Horton and Manningham.  It became a county borough with the passing of the Local Government Act 1888. The county borough was granted city status by Letters Patent in 1897.  Bradford was expanded in 1882 to include Allerton, Bolton and Undercliffe, Bowling, Heaton, Thornbury and Tyersall.  In 1899 it was further expanded by adding North Bierley, Eccleshill, Idle, Thornton, Tong and Wyke. Clayton was added in 1930.

From 1974 the county borough was merged with the Borough of Keighley, the Urban Districts of Baildon, Bingley, Denholme, Cullingworth, Ilkley, Shipley and Silsden, along with part of Queensbury and Shelf Urban District and part of Skipton Rural District by the Local Government Act 1972.

Parliamentary boundaries 

1885–1918: The Municipal Borough of Bradford, in the West Riding of Yorkshire, was divided into three single-member constituencies from the 1885 general election. Bradford East was the eastern third of Bradford and was approximately rectangular in shape. It consisted of the wards of Bradford Moor, East, East Bowling, South, and West Bowling. It bordered Pudsey to the east, Elland in the south, Bradford Central to the west and Shipley in the north.

1918–1950: In this period the constituency comprised the wards of Bradford Moor, East Bowling, Tong, and West Bowling. It was located in the south-east corner of the city of Bradford.

1950–1955: The constituency was expanded to the south-west, to include territory formerly in the Bradford South seat. The Bradford Moor area, in the north of the old East division, was transferred to Bradford Central. The wards allocated to the East division from 1950 were East Bowling, Little Horton, North Bierley East, Tong, and West Bowling.

1955–1974: The 1955 redistribution removed the western part of the old East division and expanded the seat north. North Bierley East and West Bowling wards were transferred to Bradford South. The East seat from 1955 comprised the wards of East Bowling, Exchange, Listerhills, Little Horton, South, and Tong.

In 1974 the East seat disappeared. The Bowling area became part of Bradford North; Tong joined Bradford South; and Little Horton became part of Bradford West.

From 2010: The new Bradford East is the successor seat to the Bradford North constituency, which was created for the 1918 general election. The report into the boundary review says;

"5. The Assistant Commissioner reported that he was also called upon to consider alternative names submitted for Bradford East. He rejected a number of alternatives... as he considered they did not have any merit.... He also rejected the submissions that proposed that the name Bradford North should be retained...."

The wards in this new constituency are entirely within the Bradford city boundaries:
 Bolton and Undercliffe, Bowling and Barkerend, Bradford Moor, Eccleshill, Idle and Thackley and Little Horton

Members of Parliament

MPs 1885–1974

MPs since 2010

Elections
The original constituency had its first contest at the 1885 general election and its last at the 1970 general election.

Elections in the 2010s

Election in the 1970s

Elections in the 1960s

Elections in the 1950s

Election in the 1940s

Elections in the 1930s

Election in the 1920s

Elections in the 1910s

A General Election was due to take place by the end of 1915. By the summer of 1914, the following candidates had been adopted to contest that election. Due to the outbreak of war, the election never took place.
British Socialist Party: John Stokes

Elections in the 1900s

Elections in the 1890s

Elections in the 1880s

See also
 List of parliamentary constituencies in West Yorkshire

Notes

References

Sources
 Boundaries of Parliamentary Constituencies 1885–1972, compiled and edited by F.W.S. Craig (Parliamentary Reference Publications 1972)
 British Parliamentary Election Results 1885–1918, compiled and edited by F.W.S. Craig (The Macmillan Press 1974)

External links
 nomis Constituency Profile for Bradford East — presenting data from the ONS annual population survey and other official statistics.

Parliamentary constituencies in Yorkshire and the Humber
Politics of Bradford
Constituencies of the Parliament of the United Kingdom established in 1885
Constituencies of the Parliament of the United Kingdom disestablished in 1974
Constituencies of the Parliament of the United Kingdom established in 2010